Geoffrey Edmund Brown (born 4 April 1924) is a former Australian male tennis player, born in Murrurundi, New South Wales, Australia. He attended Parramatta Marist High School in 1938-9 before joining the R.A.A.F as a gunner. He was demobilised at the end of the war and returned to playing tennis.

Brown was runner-up in the 1946 Wimbledon Championships singles final, losing in five sets to Yvon Petra, and doubles final playing with Dinny Pails. He also reached the doubles finals at the 1949 Australian Championships and 1950 Wimbledon Championships, in both he was partnered by compatriot Bill Sidwell and in both finals they lost to John Bromwich and Adrian Quist. He reached the quarterfinal at the 1949 Wimbledon Championships by defeating US champion Pancho Gonzales in the fourth round.

With his countryman Dinny Pails he won the doubles title at the Irish Tennis Championships in July 1946. He won the singles title at the Kent Lawn Tennis Championships in 1948 and 1950. In April 1949 he reached the final of the South African Championships in Johannesburg but lost in four sets to Eric Sturgess. In April 1950 Brown won the Surrey Tennis Tournament against Paddy Robert in the final. In May he played in the British Hard Court Championships in Bournemouth and reached the final in which he lost to Jaroslav Drobný. In June he defeated Sumant Misra in the singles final of the Northern Lawn Tennis Championships. Due to an illness and operation Brown did not play tennis for more than a year and returned in October 1951. In October 1952 he won the Sydney Metropolitan Grasscourt Championships, defeating Lew Hoad in the final in three sets.

In 1947 and 1948 Brown played for the Australian Davis Cup team and compiled a record of three wins and one loss.

Grand Slam finals

Singles (1 runner-up)

Doubles (3 runners-up)

Mixed doubles (2 runners-up)

References

External links
 
 
 
 Australian Open – Player profile
 British Pathe – Film Reel Wimbledon Tennis Stars In Final 1946

1924 births
Living people
Australian male tennis players
People from Upper Hunter Shire Council
Tennis people from New South Wales
Royal Australian Air Force personnel of World War II
Royal Australian Air Force airmen